Phimodera humeralis is a small shieldbug found in Europe.  Although occasionally seen in northern Europe, its primary range is southern Europe.

Description
The imago stage measures  and ranges in color from sandy ochre to pale brown.

Phimodera humeralis is found in sparsely vegetated dune terrain on heaths and sandy hills, living on and especially in the sand around Carex arenaria, a 10–40 cm-high grass.  P. humeralis is difficult to see, as from a distance they look like small light gray stones.

Adult (imago) P. humeralis hibernate through winter and mate in the spring. The mating takes about 10–15 minutes.

P. humeralis is considered an endangered species, especially in northern Europe.

External links
 

Scutelleridae
Insects described in 1823
Hemiptera of Europe